Stilson may refer to:

Places
Stilson Canyon, California, United States
Stilson, Iowa, unincorporated community, United States
Stilson, Texas, unincorporated community, United States

Given name
Stilson Hutchins (1838–1912) an American newspaper reporter and publisher, best known as founder of The Washington Post.

Other
Stilson wrench, a heavy-duty adjustable wrench
Stilson, a fictional character, see List of Ender's Game characters

See also
Stilton cheese is an English cheese, produced in two varieties: Blue and White